Peter Dzúrik (29 December 1968 – 9 September 2010) was a Slovakia international football defender or defensive midfielder. He played 45 matches and scored two goals for Slovakia.

Club career
Dzúrik, native of Košice, began playing football in district Košická Nová Ves and he moved to ZŤS Košice at the age of 17. He made his first team debut for ZŤS in the 1986–87 season. The next season, he established himself in the team, playing 16 matches. After soldiership in Znojmo he came back to ZŤS but he did not play many matches due to injury. He moved to Chemlon Humenné in 1993 and he won the Slovak Cup for club in 1996. He signed for 1. FC Košice in January 1997 and helped them win the first Slovak title ever and qualify to the 1997–98 UEFA Champions League group stage as first Slovak team ever. Dzúrik, already the national team member, transferred to Inter Bratislava in summer 2000, where he spent two years and won twice double. He ended his career in Dukla Banská Bystrica. After playing career he was coaching youth and shortly senior team of Dukla.

International career 
Dzúrik made his international debut for Slovakia on 11 March 1997 in a friendly game against Bulgaria.

International goals
Scores and results list Slovakia's goal tally first.

Death
Dzúrik succumbed to a brain tumour on 9 September 2010. He was divorced and had a son named Jakub.

Honours

Humenné
Slovak Cup: 1995–96

1. FC Košice
Corgoň Liga (2): 1996–97, 1997–98
Slovak Super Cup: 1997

Inter
Corgoň Liga (2): 1999–00, 2000–01
Slovak Cup (2): 1999–00, 2000–01

References

External links

1968 births
2010 deaths
Sportspeople from Košice
Slovak footballers
Czechoslovak footballers
Slovakia international footballers
Association football central defenders
Association football midfielders
FC VSS Košice players
ŠK Futura Humenné players
FK Inter Bratislava players
ŠK Slovan Bratislava players
FK Dukla Banská Bystrica players
Slovak Super Liga players
Slovak football managers